The Roman Catholic Diocese of Abaetetuba is a diocese located in the city of Abaetetuba in the Ecclesiastical province of Belém do Pará in Brazil.

History
 25 November 1961: Established as Territorial Prelature of Abaeté do Tocantins from Metropolitan Archdiocese of Belém do Pará
 4 August 1981: Promoted as Diocese of Abaetetuba

Leadership
 Prelates of Abaeté do Tocantins (Latin Church) 
 Giovanni Gazza (12 November 1962 – 19 September 1966)
 Bishops of Abaetetuba (Latin Church)
 Angelo Frosi, S.X. (2 February 1970 – 28 June 1995)
 Flávio Giovenale, S.D.B. (8 October 1997 – 16 December 2012); transferred to be Bishop of Santarem
 José Maria Chaves dos Reis (2013.07.03 -

Churches

Our Lady of the Conception Cathedral, Abaetetuba

References

External links
 GCatholic.org
 Catholic Hierarchy

Roman Catholic dioceses in Brazil
Christian organizations established in 1961
Abaetetuba, Roman Catholic Diocese of
Roman Catholic dioceses and prelatures established in the 20th century
1961 establishments in Brazil
Abaetetuba